Salem-Keizer School District (24J) is a school district in the U.S. state of Oregon that serves the cities of Salem and Keizer. It is the second-largest school district in the state with approximately 40,000 students and nearly 4,000 full-time equivalent (FTE) employees.

Overview
Currently, the district has 18% of its students receiving English Language Learner services, 17% receiving Special Education, 8% in the Talented and Gifted Program, and 59% in the Free and Reduced Meal Program - meaning a high percentage of students are living in poverty.

In 2008, Salem-Keizer high school students scored above the national average on the SATs. In 2009, 65 percent of high school students graduated with a high school diploma.

Salem-Keizer is a growing district with a 6% enrollment growth in the last six years (37,877 in 2003-04 to 40,282 in 2008-09). The district's facilities include 73 schools and programs in 69 locations.  The average age of schools is 45 years for elementary, 32 years for middle, and 32 years for high schools.

School board
The Salem-Keizer School Board is responsible for hiring the superintendent, adopting the annual budget, and negotiating collective bargaining agreements with District staff. The seven-person board serves as an advocate on behalf of the Salem-Keizer School District, students and its constituency. All board meetings, except for executive sessions, are open to the public, and time is set aside for public comments. School board elections are held in May as members' four-year terms expire.
 
Though the district is broken up into zones for which one board member serves a constituency, the entire district votes on every zone. Both the chairperson and the vice chairperson are nominated and elected by the Board.

The following are the current school board members: 

By 2021 the composition of the school board changed due to an influx of younger members from other ethnic backgrounds.

Demographics
In the 2009 school year, the district had 815 students classified as homeless by the Department of Education, or 2.0% of students in the district.

Schools

High schools
McKay High School
McNary High School
North Salem High School
South Salem High School
Sprague High School
West Salem High School

There are also several alternative secondary school programs known collectively as Roberts High School, which includes SK Online.

Middle schools
Claggett Creek Middle School
Crossler Middle School
Houck Middle School
Judson Middle School
Leslie Middle School
Leslie was named for Reverend David Leslie, one of the founders of Salem and of Willamette University. The school opened on September 19, 1927. At its original location on Howard Street, it served 401 students the first year. Over the years it added a swimming pool, gymnasium, and cafeteria. At its peak enrollment in 1956, Leslie Middle School had an enrollment of 1,530 students.
Leslie's elementary feeder system consists of Bush, Richmond, McKinley, Morningside, and Candalaria elementary schools. All of Leslie's students move into South Salem High School upon graduation.
Originally located at 710 Howard St SE, Leslie Middle School moved to its current location at 3850 Pringle Road SE in 1997. The old location, which abuts South Salem High School, was once used as the high school annex and is now used by Howard Street Charter School.
Parrish Middle School
Stephens Middle School
Straub Middle School
Straub, in West Salem, opened in 2011 and is named after Oregon Governor Bob Straub.
Waldo Middle School
Walker Middle School
Walker was the only middle school in West Salem until Straub Middle School opened in 2011. Walker serves students in grades 6–8. Average enrollment is 1,100 students. The school was established as Walker Junior High in 1962, and was named for Major Walter M. Walker. Actor Jon Heder attended Walker.
Whiteaker Middle School

Charter schools
Valley Inquiry Charter School
Early College High School
Howard Street Charter School
Jane Goodall Environmental Middle School
Optimum Learning Environment Charter School

Elementary schools
Auburn Elementary School
Battle Creek Elementary School
Brush College Elementary School
Bush Elementary School
Named after newspaper publisher and banker Asahel Bush, the school opened in 1936 as a consolidation of Lincoln, Yew Park, and other elementary schools. The 14 classroom, $192,531.83 building was the first school in Salem with an intercom. It had two 1930s murals from a program of the Works Progress Administration. The peak enrollment was in the 1952-1953 school year, 498 students. By the 1984-1985 school year the enrollment declined to 226, prompting the school district to discuss with Salem Hospital, the idea of selling the school. In 1986 the Council of Teachers of English named Bush a "national center of excellence". The Brandon Johnson Memorial Playground, named after a student who died in 1989, was the first Oregon playground customized for children who use wheelchairs; it opened in 1990. A new 12 classroom, $6.2 million campus began construction in late 2004, financed by the hospital, which agreed to purchase the original school. The previous school was demolished in 2005 after the murals were removed, and a parking lot serving the hospital was put in its place. The new school campus opened that year. The murals are now located at North Salem High School.
Candalaria Elementary School
Chapman Hill Elementary School
Chávez Elementary School
Clear Lake Elementary School
Cummings Elementary School
Englewood Elementary School
Eyre Elementary School
Forest Ridge Elementary School
Four Corners Elementary School
Grant Community School
Gubser Elementary School
Hallman Elementary School
Hammond Elementary School
Harritt Elementary School
Hayesville Elementary School
Highland Elementary School
Hoover Elementary School
Kalapuya Elementary School
Keizer Elementary School
Kennedy Elementary School
Lamb Elementary School
Lee Elementary School
Liberty Elementary School
McKinley Elementary School
Miller Elementary School
Morningside Elementary School
Myers Elementary School
Pringle Elementary School
Richmond Elementary School
Salem Heights Elementary School
Schirle Elementary School
Scott Elementary School
Sumpter Elementary School
Swegle Elementary School
Washington Elementary School
Weddle Elementary School
Wright Elementary School
Yoshikai Elementary School

Former schools
The district closed several small rural schools in the 2010s, including Rosedale and Hazel Green.
Bethel Elementary School, named after the Bethel Church, built in that locale by the Dunkards; now used for a Head Start program and the central Head Start office
Fruitland Elementary School, now the district preschool office and Head Start
Hazel Green Elementary School, now Valley Inquiry Charter School
Lake Labish Elementary School
Middle Grove Elementary School
Rosedale Elementary School, now being used by the independent private Abiqua Academy

References

School districts in Oregon
Keizer, Oregon
Education in Salem, Oregon
Education in Polk County, Oregon
1855 establishments in Oregon Territory
School districts established in 1855